The posters for the movie Battleship Potemkin created by Aleksandr Rodchenko in 1925 became prominent examples of Soviet constructivist art. One version shows a sniper sight on two scenes of Eisenstein's movie, representing two guns of the Battleship.

Another version was created in 1926. Being part of collections of museums such as Valencia's IVAM, shows a much clearer image. Using a central romboid figure with the Battleship on it, combines graphic design and photomontage to create an image where the Battleship is the main protagonist. The clear image contrasts with the aggressive use of painting, whereas the diagonal lines are also a recognizable trait of the work.

There is also a poster where the central figure is a sailor, with the Battleship on the central background.

References 

Institut Valencià d'Art Modern
Posters
1925 in art